Malaverd is an archaeological site in the north of Kermanshah, in Iran. Malaverd is one of the Paleolithic cave sites in the south of Mount Meywala. This site was recorded during a survey conducted be Fereidoun Biglari in 1999  and registered in the Iran National Heritage List in 2005. 
The site was excavated by a team of archaeologists under the direction of Sonia Shidrang in August 2012.
The site contained a 170 cm thick sequence of archaeological deposits. The excavations revealed that the cave was occupied during the Middle Paleolithic ( 60,000 to 40,000 years ago), Upper Paleolithic ( 35,000 to 28,000 years ago), Chalcolithic, Iron Age III, and Parthian. The cave is the first Upper Paleolithic site in the Kermanshah region that was excavated by an Iranian archaeologist and the first dated Upper Paleolithic site in the region.
The other important cave site near Malaverd is Do-Ashkaft Cave.

References 

1999 archaeological discoveries
Caves of Iran
Landforms of Kermanshah Province
Archaeological sites in Iran
Neanderthal sites
Mousterian
Upper Paleolithic sites
Prehistoric Iran
2012 archaeological discoveries
National works of Iran
Kermanshah